The Missing People is a 1940 British, black-and-white, mystery film directed by Jack Raymond and starring Ronald Shiner as Sam Hackett and Will Fyffe as Mr. J. G. Reeder. It was produced by Jack Raymond Productions. Ronald Shiner, Will Fyffe and Jack Raymond were also all involved in another Mr. Reeder film, The Mind of Mr. Reeder. The film is based on a novel by Edgar Wallace.

Synopsis
Mr. Reeder (comedian Will Fyffe) begins solving the disappearance of 27 people, after they had each received large sums of money from their respective families. Is the criminal-featured Joseph Bronstone (Lyn Harding), the guilty party?

Cast
J. G. Reeder - Will Fyffe
Peggy Gillette - Kay Walsh
Joseph Bronstone - Lyn Harding
Sam Hackett - Ronald Shiner
Doris Bevan - Patricia Roc
Ernest Bronstone - Anthony Holles
Harry Morgan - Reginald Purdell
Housekeeper - Maire O'Neill

Critical reception
TV Guide wrote, "Fyffe adds a great deal of charm to his role as he pieces the puzzle together in a manner baffling to the younger detectives. Otherwise, the plot is unbelievable but makes for some light-hearted fun."

References

External links
 
 
 

1940 films
1940 mystery films
British black-and-white films
British mystery films
Films based on works by Edgar Wallace
Films directed by Jack Raymond
Films scored by Percival Mackey
Films about missing people
1940s English-language films
1940s British films